Jogbani railway station serves Jogbani in Araria district in the Indian state of Bihar.

See also
Indian Railways

References

Railway junction stations in Bihar
Railway stations in Araria district